Frank Boynton (born  1936) is an American professional golfer.

Boynton grew up in Orlando, Florida. He played college golf at Rollins College. He turned professional in 1956.

Boynton played on the PGA Tour from 1958 to 1963 and again from 1967 to 1969. His best finishes were a 2nd at the 1962 St. Petersburg Open Invitational and a T-2 at the 1968 Tucson Open Invitational. His best finish in a major was a T-8 at the 1968 PGA Championship.

After leaving the PGA Tour, Boynton started a financial services company in Kerrville, Texas, Boynton Financial.

Professional wins (2)
1966 Ohio Open
1967 Ohio Open

References

American male golfers
Rollins Tars athletes
PGA Tour golfers
Golfers from Texas
Golfers from Orlando, Florida
People from Kerrville, Texas
1930s births
Living people